Ledesma is a town in the province of Salamanca (Spain). According to the 2016 census there are 1,767 inhabitants. Its Spanish postal code is 37100.

In ancient Roman times, the town was called Bletisa. It is possible that the Bletonesii lived in this area.

Heritage

The Castle
What we see today of the building, despite its grandeur is a small part of the initial splendor, the entire wall that covered this fortress in its part outside the walls has been lost and, for the intramural part, the accesses and towers that they connected it to an annex building, possibly a palace.

La Plaza de la Fortaleza
It is a large landscaped esplanade that shelters a series of subways, vaulted chambers, conduits, powder magazines ... that would constitute the cellars and water pipes of the hypothetical palace that began to be built annex to the palace in the late fifteenth century early XVI.

Casa Consistorial (Town Hall)
It is a building started in 1484, rectangular in shape and constituted as a large solid building and almost fortified in appearance.

Puente Mocho
The Mocho Bridge is located 3 km north of Ledesma, on the Roman road that linked Ledesma with Zamora to save the Cañedo riverbank. It has five semicircular arches. Its construction has been repeatedly attributed to Roman times.

Gothic and Renaissance palaces
There are several palaces that Ledesma preserves from the late fifteenth and early sixteenth centuries.

Iglesia de Santa María la Mayor (Church)
Begun to build in the last third of the 12th century in the final Romanesque style, from that time today only the arch through which Calle de los Curas runs in the lower part of the tower remains.

The great extension that is made between 1492 and 1500 is commissioned to Juan Gil de Hontañón el Viejo and consists of the construction of the entire nave of the church up to the triumphal arch that separates it from the Main Chapel and the middle body of the tower , decorated with the typical Elizabethan balls.

The style of this work is considered one of the greatest exponents of the Spanish-Flemish Gothic style due to the ribbed vaults of "herringbone" and the risky curved arch of the back choir. It is in 1556 when he commissioned Juan Gil de Hontañón, the Mozo to build the highest part of the tower and the project of the Main Chapel, finally carried out by Pedro de Inestrosa and Pedro de Gamboa.

See also
 List of municipalities in Salamanca

References

Municipalities in the Province of Salamanca